Dusán Kovács (born 31 July 1971 in Balassagyarmat) is a retired Hungarian athlete who specialised in the 400 metres hurdles. He represented his country at the 1996 Summer Olympics, as well as three consecutive World Championships starting in 1993. In addition he won two bronze medals at the 1993 Summer Universiade.

His personal best in the event is 48.45 seconds set at the 1997 World Championships in Athens where he narrowly missed the final. This is the standing national record. He is now an athletics commentator for Hungarian Eurosport.

Competition record

References

1971 births
Living people
People from Balassagyarmat
Hungarian male hurdlers
Hungarian decathletes
Olympic athletes of Hungary
Athletes (track and field) at the 1996 Summer Olympics
World Athletics Championships athletes for Hungary
Universiade medalists in athletics (track and field)
Universiade bronze medalists for Hungary
Competitors at the 1991 Summer Universiade
Medalists at the 1993 Summer Universiade
Sportspeople from Nógrád County